The Buddha Maitreya is a statue of Maitreya dated to 5th century China. Made from gilt bronze, the state is the largest early gilt-bronze Chinese sculpture. The statue is in the collection of the Metropolitan Museum of Art.

References 

Sculptures of the Metropolitan Museum of Art
Chinese sculpture
Maitreya
Bronze sculptures